The International Auschwitz Committee was formed by survivors of the Auschwitz death camp in 1952 for the support of the survivors and to fight racism and anti-Semitism. The committee's mission was to maintain contact with survivors on both sides of the Iron Curtain and serve as an outreach program to young adults in the community. Its secretary is now based in Berlin (German: Koordinationsbüro des IAK).

People

 Former chairman and honorary chairman was Kurt Goldstein (1914–2007). 
 Tadeusz Hołuj (1916–1985), former secretary general
 Roman Kent (1929–2021), former president 
 Felix Kolmer (1922-2022), former executive vice-president

See also 
 International concentration camp committees

References

Further reading
  Collected writings.

External links
 International Auschwitz Committee 
 The Coordinating Office of the IAC 
 The Auschwitz-Birkenau Foundation (January 20, 2009)

Organizations established in 1952
1952 establishments in Austria
Holocaust commemoration
Jewish refugee aid organizations
The Holocaust and the United States